Yenipınar (Turkish: "new springs") may refer to the following places in Turkey:

 Yenipınar, Aksaray, a village in the district of Aksaray, Aksaray Province
 Yenipınar, Beşiri, a village in the district of Beşiri, Batman Province